The A69 is a major northern trunk road in England, running east–west across the Pennines, through the counties of Tyne and Wear, Northumberland and Cumbria. Originally, the road started in the centre of Newcastle upon Tyne then later near Birtley, but since the creation of the A1 Western Bypass around Newcastle upon Tyne, it now starts at Denton Burn, a suburb of Newcastle upon Tyne.

The route from the A1 junction to Carlisle city centre is 54 miles (87 km).

Settlements on the route 
 Denton Burn
 West Denton
 Throckley
 (Corbridge)
 (Hexham)
 (Haydon Bridge)
 Bardon Mill
 Melkridge
 (Haltwhistle)
 (Brampton)
 Warwick Bridge
 Warwick-on-Eden
 Botcherby
 Carlisle
Places with parentheses are indicative of historically being on the A69, but have now been bypassed

Description of the route 
The road runs westwards from the A1 at Denton Burn in Newcastle upon Tyne through the suburbs of Denton Burn and West Denton before a junction with the A6085 and the B6323. It continues west and passes over what was Hadrian's Wall, which until now has been south of the road, at Milecastle 13 on the wall. Hereafter the road is always south of the wall. The road carries on up the Tyne valley, bypassing the village of Corbridge and the market town Hexham. The A69 crosses the River Tyne west of Hexham (Constantius Bridge), re-crosses it west of the village of Haydon Bridge, and yet again as it bypasses Haltwhistle.

After crossing the border into Cumbria, the A69 by-passes the town of Brampton, before coming to a roundabout junction with the A689 road. The A69 turns left here and travels through the village of Warwick Bridge, which is planned to be by-passed in the future. Following a short piece of dual carriageway, the A69 comes to Junction 43 of the M6 motorway, which skirts the eastern edge of Carlisle.

The A69 into Carlisle has the name Warwick Road, and is known to be one of the most congested roads in the county. At Saint Aidan's church, the A69 turns right up Victoria Place, and meets the A7 road at a busy traffic-light controlled crossroads, where it terminates.

The road forms part of the unsigned Euroroute E18. It is maintained by RoadLink.

Historical sections of road numbered A69

At its eastern end, the A69 historically ran from its current terminus with the A1 at Denton Burn eastward along Westgate Road (now the western end of the A186) in Newcastle upon Tyne, terminating at the junction between Westgate Road and Neville Street in central Newcastle near Newcastle Central station.

The construction of the Gateshead Western Bypass saw the section of A69 from Denton Burn into central Newcastle renumbered A186, with the A69 then passing over Scotswood Bridge and following the Gateshead Western Bypass to Birtley where it joined the A1(M).   The later construction of the Newcastle Western Bypass saw the Gateshead Western Bypass section renumbered A1 as the A1 was diverted to the west of Newcastle upon Tyne city centre and over the new Blaydon Bridge, with the A69 curtailed to its current terminus at Denton Burn.

Standard of route 
The A69 is a major route linking the north-east and north-west of England, and as such has primary status throughout. The rest of the route, apart from a short dual carriageway section near the M6 Junction 43 is single carriageway, with occasional climbing lanes.

Haydon Bridge bypass 

Haydon Bridge was the last village on the A69 in Northumberland to gain a bypass. This was officially opened on Wednesday 25 March 2009 and passes to the south of the village with a new bridge over the River South Tyne to the west of the village.

Safety 
A report on the A69 in 2011 noted that in the previous year 82 accidents were recorded with 130 injuries, 10 serious injuries and four deaths. Campaigning has been ongoing to get the section from Hexham to Carlisle dualled to allow vehicles to overtake safely.

References

Roads in Cumbria
Roads in England
Transport in Tyne and Wear
Roads in Northumberland